The 2003 Barber Dodge Pro Series season was the eighteenth and final season of the series. All races were run in support of the 2003 CART World Series. The season consisted of ten races of which four were run abroad, one in Mexico and three in Canada. Leonardo Maia won the championship and Colin Fleming won the Rookie of the Year title. This was the first, and only, time the series raced in Mexico.

Drivers
All driver use Dodge powered Michelin shod Reynard 98E chassis.

Race calendar and results

Final standings

References

Barber Dodge Pro Series
2003 in American motorsport